Walter Zürrer (born 8 June 1879) was a Swiss footballer who played as striker and midfielder for FC Basel in the 1890s.

Football career
FC Basel was founded on 15 November 1893 and Zürrer joined the club about three years later, during their 1897–98 season. Zürrer played his first game for the club in the home game on 24 October 1897 as Basel won 7–0 against Biel-Bienne. Unfortunately, the goal scorers in this match are not known.

He played with the club this one season and during this time Zürrer played three games for Basel without scoring a goal.

Zürrer played his last game with the team in the home game in the St. Jakob Stadium on 14 November as Basel won 3–1 against FC Excelsior Zürich.

Notes

Footnotes

References

Sources
 Rotblau: Jahrbuch Saison 2017/2018. Publisher: FC Basel Marketing AG. 
 Die ersten 125 Jahre. Publisher: Josef Zindel im Friedrich Reinhardt Verlag, Basel. 
 Verein "Basler Fussballarchiv" Homepage
(NB: Despite all efforts, the editors of these books and the authors in "Basler Fussballarchiv" have failed to be able to identify all the players, their date and place of birth or date and place of death, who played in the games during the early years of FC Basel)

FC Basel players
Swiss men's footballers
Association football midfielders
Association football forwards
1879 births
1955 deaths